This is a list of English and Welsh cricket leagues recognised and supported by the England and Wales Cricket Board as ECB Premier Leagues, and beneath the League titles are the cricket clubs that are in their top divisions in the 2018 English cricket season. These leagues and clubs are the top echelons of the amateur, recreational game of cricket in England and Wales.

There are also non-ECB-affiliated leagues such as the Lancashire League and the Central Lancashire League, as their standards of cricket also represent the highest standards in the English (and Welsh) non-first-class game.

ECB Premier Leagues

Independent leagues

Central Lancashire Cricket League
Ashton | Clifton | Crompton | Heywood | Littleborough | Middleton | Milnrow | Monton & Weaste | Norden | Oldham | Radcliffe | Rochdale | Royton | Unsworth | Walsden | Werneth

Lancashire League
Accrington | Bacup | Burnley | Church | Colne | East Lancashire | Enfield | Haslingden | Lowerhouse | Nelson | Ramsbottom | Rawtenstall | Rishton | Todmorden

Yorkshire and Derbyshire League
52 teams.

See also
Club cricket
ECB National Club Cricket Championship
ECB National Club Twenty20

External links 
 Play-cricket.com

References

English cricket clubs
English cricket clubs
Cricket teams in England
Cricket teams in Wales